Paul Y. Hoskisson (born 1943) is an American professor of Ancient scripture and former associate dean of Religious Education at Brigham Young University (BYU).  In 2008, he was appointed director of the Laura F. Willes Center for Book of Mormon Research.

Biographical background
Hoskisson is a member of the Church of Jesus Christ of Latter-day Saints (LDS Church).  He holds bachelor's and master's degrees from BYU and received a Ph.D. in Ancient Near Eastern Studies from Brandeis University in 1986.

Hoskisson's wife is Joaquina V. Hoskisson.  She is a native of Spain and a Spanish professor at BYU.  They are the parents of four children.

Career
Hoskisson has taught at BYU since 1981.  Before that he taught at the University of Zurich and worked at the University of Tübingen.  Hoskisson has also served as Fulbright Program adviser at BYU.

Hoskisson is a member of several professional academic associations, including the Society of Biblical Literature, the American Oriental Society, the American Schools of Oriental Research, and the Mormon History Association.  He has served on the board of trustees for the American Schools of Oriental Research.

Hoskisson has published research on the Book of Mormon, the Old Testament, and other LDS subjects.  For example, he wrote about pre-600 B.C. scimitars in the Middle East, thus making their presence possible among Lehi and his descendants in the new world in ways that were previously denied.  Hoskisson edited Historicity and the Latter-day Saints, an anthology by BYU's Religious Studies Center, in which he contributed a paper on the need for historicity.  He also contributed several articles to FARMS' Journal of Book of Mormon Studies that explore possible ancient meanings behind names in the Book of Mormon.

In September 2008, Hoskisson was appointed the director of BYU's Laura F. Willes Center for Book of Mormon Research.

Published work

.

.

References

External links
BYU faculty bio page

1943 births
Latter Day Saints from Massachusetts
American Assyriologists
Brandeis University alumni
Brigham Young University alumni
Brigham Young University faculty
Academic staff of the University of Tübingen
Academic staff of the University of Zurich
Living people
Mormon apologists
American expatriates in Germany
American expatriates in Switzerland
Maxwell Institute people
Latter Day Saints from Utah
Assyriologists